Admags or ad mags (short for Advertising magazines) were an early alternative to the commercial break in the 1950s and 1960s, broadcast on the then-new commercial network ITV in the United Kingdom. Beginning as a result of the Television Act 1954, and designed mainly to provide advertising space for smaller companies who couldn't afford slots during regular ad breaks, admags became popular in their own right. Each had a loose story format, much like a soap opera, with each episode featuring a collection of commercially available products.

Programming

Jim's Inn 
The most popular admag was Jim's Inn, a soap opera starring Jimmy and Maggie Hanley. By 1957, Jim's Inn had become so popular that Associated-Rediffusion claimed that it was now rivalling the popularity of long-established programmes on the BBC, such as The Archers. It ran for 300 editions, and after the ban on admags in 1963, the couple appeared running ‘Jim’s Stores’ in a series of adverts for Daz washing powder.

Elizabeth Goes Shopping 
The first of the admags, Elizabeth Goes Shopping was hosted by Elizabeth Allan, who would visit upmarket London stores.

Other admags 
Other admags included About Homes and Gardens (1956), Bazaar (1957-1959), Fancy That! (1956), For Pete’s Sake (1957-1958), Girl With a Date and Home With Joy Shelton (1955-1956).

Ban 
Admags were withdrawn from British television after a 1962 report by Sir Harry Pilkington into the practices of the nascent ITV network which condemned the admag format. Parliament prohibited admags in 1963. Product placement would not be allowed again on British television until 2011.

See also 
 Product placement
 Infomercial
 Subliminal advertising
 History of ITV

References 

Television in the United Kingdom
1955 establishments in the United Kingdom
1963 disestablishments in the United Kingdom
1950s British television series
1960s British television series
1955 British television series debuts
1963 British television series endings
Black-and-white British television shows